Granville Island is a peninsula and shopping district in the Fairview neighbourhood of Vancouver, British Columbia, Canada. It is located across False Creek from Downtown Vancouver under the south end of the Granville Street Bridge. The peninsula was an industrial manufacturing area in the 20th century. The area was named after Granville Leveson-Gower, 2nd Earl Granville.

Granville Island includes a public market, a marina, a hotel, the False Creek Community Centre, as well as various performing arts theatres including the Arts Club Theatre Company and Carousel Theatre.

Granville Island was used as the finale of the film Mission: Impossible – Ghost Protocol (2011).

The Vancouver International Children's Festival, the Vancouver Fringe Festival, and the Vancouver Writers Fest are all located here.

Transportation 
False Creek Ferries and Aquabus provide ferry service from Granville Island to Downtown Vancouver, Yaletown, False Creek, the West End, and Vanier Park. Other water transportation options include a water taxi service to Bowen Island provided by English Bay Launch.

WESTCOAST Sightseeing and Vancouver Trolley Hop-On, Hop-Off services both have stops located at Granville Island.

Between 1998 and 2011, the Vancouver Downtown Historic Railway operated between Granville Island and Science World. The streetcar is now permanently shut down.

History
The peninsula was originally used by the Musqueam Indian Band and the Squamish people as a fishing area.

The city of Vancouver was called Granville until it was renamed in 1886, but the former name was kept and given to Granville Street, which spanned the small inlet known as False Creek. False Creek in the late 19th century was more than twice today's size, and its tidal flats included a large permanent sandbar over which spanned the original, rickety, wooden Granville Street bridge. This sandbar, which would eventually become Granville Island, was first mapped by Captain George Henry Richards in the British Boundary Commission's naval expedition in 1858–59, and the island today conforms roughly to the size and shape documented at that time. A British Admiralty Chart of 1893 shows the island in greater detail and conforming even more accurately to today's Granville Island.

Shortly after the creation of the original Granville Street bridge in 1889, the first, unofficial, attempt was made to stabilize the sandbar by driving piles around the perimeter in order to create some free real estate. The Federal government put a stop to the work as a menace to navigation, but the piles remain visible in a photo taken in 1891.

In 1915, with the port of Vancouver growing, the newly formed Vancouver Harbour Commission approved a reclamation project in False Creek for an industrial area. A  island, connected to the mainland by a combined road and rail bridge at its south end, was to be built. Almost  of fill was dredged largely by a man named Alvin Kingston, from the surrounding waters of False Creek to create the island under the Granville Street Bridge. The total cost for the reclamation was $342,000. It was originally called Industrial Island, but Granville Island, named after the bridge, that ran directly overhead, was the name that stuck.

The very first tenant, B.C. Equipment Ltd., set the standard by building a wood-framed machine shop, clad on all sides in corrugated tin, at the Island's western end. (Today the same structure houses part of the Granville Island Public Market.) The company repaired and assembled heavy equipment for mining and forestry industries and used barges for shipping.

By 1923, virtually every lot on the Island was occupied, mostly by similar corrugated-tin factories.

During the Great Depression, one of Vancouver's several hobo jungles sprang up on the False Creek flats opposite Granville Island's north shore. "Shackers" lived on the island, in town, or in floathouses, and survived by fishing and beachcombing and sold salmon, smelt, and wood door to door or at the public market on Main Street. They were basically self-sufficient and were left alone.

During the Second World War, Wright's Canadian Ropes on the island was Canada's biggest manufacturer of heavy-duty wire rope. Their Green Heart product was supplied to forestry and mining industries. A fire in 1953 gutted their Granville Island factory so they moved to south Vancouver in 1956.
In 1972, a federal order-in-council assigned management of the 14-hectare site to Canada Mortgage and Housing Corporation (CMHC). The federal government invested $24.7 million there between 1973 and 1982. In 1979, the federal and provincial governments converted a 50,000 square foot building to the Public Market. In 1980, the Emily Carr University of Art & Design was added to the island.

Ron Basford, the Minister responsible for CMHC was, was referred to as Mr. Granville and was later recognized with the naming of Ron Basford Park on Granville Island.

In 2016, the federal government announced a commitment to develop a 2040 plan to redevelop the island, in part because the Emily Carr University was going to move off the island.

Granville Island Public Market
The Granville Island Public Market was established in 1979 as a location where farmers and other food vendors could sell to consumers. It operates year-round in an enclosed facility where customers can purchase fresh produce, meat, fish and seafood, cheeses and other products, many locally sourced. There are generally 50 vendors in the market. The market includes retail food vendors, selling a range of items from Mexican, Asian, Greek and deli food to candy and snacks. The market attracts both local residents and tourists. The market includes a "kids market" designed for children.

Other businesses
Granville Island Brewing Co. is the name of a beer company which originated on Granville Island in 1984, but whose main base of operations was moved to Kelowna, British Columbia, sometime later. In 2009 it was purchased by Molson's Brewery and continues to brew small batches of its varieties at the Granville Island brewing original site and offers beer tasting and tours of their brewing facilities.

Ocean Concrete is the longest-established tenant on the island, having set up shop there in 1917. In 2014, OSGEMEOS (Portuguese for THE TWINS), consisting of brother duo Gustavo and Otavio Pandolfo, revamped the concrete silos with their ongoing mural project, 'Giants'.

Granville Island is home to several theatre companies such as the Arts Club Theatre Company, Arts Umbrella, Axis Theatre Company, Boca Del Lupo, Carousel Theatre for Young People, Ruby Slippers Production Company, and the Vancouver Theatre Sports League.

Canada's only physical hammock shop, the Hamuhk Hangout Place, has been operating on Granville Island since 1995.

Gallery

Notable residents
 Jim Coleman (1911–2001), Canadian sports journalist, writer and press secretary

References

External links 

 Official Granville Island website
 Granville Island Cultural Society Information about busking (street performing) on Granville Island and theatre information
 Satellite image of Granville Island from Google maps.
 Granville Island Day Vendors Association website
 Granville Island Business and Community Association website
 Granville Island Works community website
 The Growing Pains of Vancouver – Internet radio documentary discussing Granville Island from 24'00" till 34'43".

Shopping districts and streets in Canada
Shopping malls in Metro Vancouver
Neighbourhoods in Vancouver
Busking venues
Retail markets in Canada
Islands of British Columbia
Tourist attractions in Vancouver
Former islands of Canada
Adaptive reuse of industrial structures in Canada
Market halls
Food retailers